Real Teatro de las Cortes is a theatre located on Calle de las Cortes in San Fernando in the Province of Cádiz, Andalusia, Spain. It was established on 1 April 1804 as Teatro Cómico, and currently seats 433 people.

References

External links
Official site

Buildings and structures in San Fernando, Cádiz
Theatres in Spain